Binissalem is a small municipality in the district of Raiguer on Majorca, one of the Balearic Islands, Spain, and the centre of the island's wine region of Binissalem DOP.

Transport
Binissalem's railway station is served by frequent services from Palma to Inca and onto Sa Pobla and Manacor.

Notable people
Miguel Ángel Moyà (born 1984), professional football player
Alba Torrens (born 1989), professional basketball player, MVP of EuroBasket Women 2017

References

External links
Ajuntament de Binissalem
Binissalem local tourist guide

Municipalities in Mallorca
Populated places in Mallorca